When It Hurts may refer to:

"When It Hurts", a song by Avant from the 2008 self titled album Avant 
"When It Hurts", a song by Leona Lewis from her 2012 album Glassheart

See also
"Even When It Hurts (Praise Song)", a Hillsong United song from their 2015 album Empires